Bill Arnold is a cinematographer. His film credits include the David Sutherland award-winning documentary films The Farmer's Wife (1998) and Country Boys (2006). He was also the cinematographer for the American reality television series Airline. He has recently been working as a cinematographer with the Canadian television news magazine The Fifth Estate.

Notable work
 The Farmer's Wife, the 1998 documentary film which won the 1999 New England Film & Video Festival (New England Spirit Award).
Airline, the 2004 American television series which was nominated for a 2005 People's Choice Awards in the category of “Favorite Reality Show”.
Country Boys, the 2006 documentary film which won the 2006 TCA Awards for Outstanding Achievement in News and Information

References

External links
 

American cinematographers
Living people
Year of birth missing (living people)